Boa Howl is the second studio album by Dublin band Halves.
It was released July 2013 through the band's own record label 'Hateistheenemy'.

Recording
Recorded over two weeks at Svenska Grammofon Studion in Gothenburg. Guest vocals appear courtesy of Gemma Hayes, a fan of the band for some time. Canadian musician Elaine Kelly-Canning features on harp and added string performances come courtesy of local Swedish players. 
'Boa Howl' refers to a summit on a mountain in China dubbed 'White Boa Howl', which the band felt captured the surreal nature of the songs.

Track listing
All tracks written by Halves.
 "Drumhunter" – 4:29
 "The Glass Wreckage" – 4:05
 "Drip Pools" – 4:09
 "Tanager Peak" – 4:24
 "Best Summer" – 5:02
 "White Boa Howl" – 3:43
 "Bring Your Bad Luck" – 4:42
 "Hug the Blood" – 5:48
 "Slow Drawl Moon (For David)" – 4:03
 "Polynia" – 5:53
 "Let Them Come" – 6:05

References

External links
 Boa Howl site
 Halves site
 Facebook
 YouTube
 Twitter
 Halves photography

2013 albums
Halves (band) albums
Self-released albums